The 2014 Copa do Nordeste was the 11th edition of the main football tournament featuring teams from the Brazilian Nordeste. The competition featured 16 clubs, with Bahia and Pernambuco having three seeds each, and Ceará, Rio Grande do Norte, Sergipe, Alagoas and Paraíba with two seeds each. The 2014 Copa do Nordeste did not feature teams from the states of Maranhão and Piauí, though they are slated to enter the tournament in its 2015 edition.  The champions, Sport Recife, earned a berth in the 2014 Copa Sudamericana.

Qualified teams

A. River Plate was originally qualified as runners-up of the 2013 Campeonato Sergipano. Because of their request to be absent for 2 two years of the Campeonato Sergiano due to financial problems, Confiança earned their spot.

Group stage

Group A

Group B

Group C

Group D

Knockout phase

Bracket

Quarterfinals

Semifinals

Finals

Top scorers

References 

Copa do Nordeste
2014
2014 in Brazilian football